Little Acts of Treason is an album released in 1995 by American country music singer Carlene Carter. Included is "Loose Talk," a duet with Carter's father, veteran country musician Carl Smith. The album's lead-off single "Love Like This" was originally recorded by Blackhawk for their 1994 debut album, Blackhawk, and before that by Kennedy Rose on their 1990 album hai ku.

Carter co-produced with James Stroud on tracks 1–4, 8, 10 and 11 and Howie Epstein on track 12; she produced the rest of the album herself.

Track listing

Personnel
Carlene Carter - vocals, guitar, autoharp, marxophone, percussion, glockenspiel, bongos, piano, keyboards
Johnny Cash - background vocals
Carl Smith - vocals
Alan Gordon Anderson - lead guitar, electric guitar, acoustic guitar, vocals
John Jorgenson - lead guitar, electric guitar, acoustic guitar, slide guitar, mandolin, sitar
Matt Rollings - piano
Mickey Raphael - harmonica
Eddie Bayers - drums
Robert Becker - violin
Benmont Tench - piano, organ, keyboards, fiddle, 
Michael Black - background vocals
Kenneth Burward-Hoy - viola
Larry Byrom - acoustic guitar, slide guitar
Darius Campo - viola
Howie Epstein - background vocals
Sheila "Sheila E." Escovedo - percussion
Paul Franklin - guitar, steel guitar, pedal steel guitar
John Hobbs - piano, organ
Dann Huff - electric guitar
Danny Jacob - guitar
Scott Joss - fiddle, harmonica
Jana King - background vocals
Jay Dee Maness - pedal steel guitar
Jim Lauderdale - vocals
Mark O'Connor - fiddle
Sid Page - concertmaster
Phil Parlapiano - accordion, harmonium, keyboards, mandolin
Mickey Rafael - harmonica
Rachel Robinson - flageolet, violin
Vince Santoro - drums, percussion, vocals
Joe Spivey - mandolin
Glenn Worf - bass
Curtis Young - background vocals
Jim Hanson - bass, vocals
Barbara Santoro - background vocals
Bruce Dukov, Lily Ho Chen, David Ewart, Michael Markham - violin
Tiffany A. Lowe - background vocals
Not Quite Ready for the Opry Singers - choir, chorus
Steve Richards - cello

Chart performance

References

1995 albums
Carlene Carter albums
Albums produced by James Stroud
Giant Records (Warner) albums